The 25th César Awards ceremony, presented by the Académie des Arts et Techniques du Cinéma, honoured the best films of 1999 in France and took place on 19 February 2000 at the Théâtre des Champs-Élysées in Paris. The ceremony was chaired by Alain Delon and hosted by Alain Chabat. Venus Beauty Institute won the award for Best Film.

Winners and nominees

See also
 72nd Academy Awards
 53rd British Academy Film Awards
 12th European Film Awards
 5th Lumières Awards

External links

 Official website
 
 25th César Awards at AlloCiné

2000
2000 film awards
2000 in French cinema
2000 in Paris
February 2000 events in France